Buddy's Day Out is a 1933 Warner Bros. Looney Tunes cartoon, directed by Tom Palmer. The short was released in theaters on September 9, 1933, premiering with Goodbye Again, and was the first cartoon to feature Buddy, the second star of the series who was created by Earl Duvall.

A former Disney animator, Palmer was shortly thereafter fired from the studio. This short was the first cartoon produced by Leon Schlesinger Productions.

Summary
Cookie is giving her baby brother Elmer a bath, while Buddy washes his car with a hose. Buddy's dog Happy grabs the hose and is tossed around by the water pressure. Cookie puts on makeup and yells to Buddy that she is ready. Buddy starts his car with a crank starter, but when the car starts it runs off unattended through the neighborhood. It runs through a greenhouse, and stops at Cookie's house, draped with flowers from the greenhouse, which Cookie thinks is beautiful. Buddy loads a picnic basket in the car and drives off with Cookie and Elmer. Happy runs behind and jumps in the car.
 
The car struggles to climb up a hill and comes to a stop at the picnic spot. Buddy unloads the car while Cookie plays guitar and sings. Various animals join in the song. Meanwhile Elmer and Happy eat some of the food from the picnic basket. Cookie scolds Elmer, who sadly climbs back in the car and accidentally starts it. The car, containing Elmer and Happy, rolls downhill out of control while Buddy and Cookie chase it, riding in Elmer's baby carriage.

The car crashes through various obstacles, including a rotary clothesline, which lands in the baby carriage, turning it into a helicopter. Buddy and Cookie, flying above the car, see it turn onto a railroad track facing an oncoming train. They land the baby carriage and use a ladder to divert the train off the track, saving Elmer.

Production
The film was directed by Tom Palmer and was one of only two films completed by him for the Schlesinger studio. According to animation historian Michael Barrier, Palmer's approach in directing Buddy's Day Out was rather loose. In the story conferences which determined the contents of the film, Palmer would suggest adding "a funny piece of business", a visual gag. He failed to specify the use of anything particularly funny. According to later interviews with Bernard B. Brown and Bob Clampett, Palmer's original version of the film was virtually devoid of gags. The Warner Bros. studio rejected this version and the film had to be reworked extensively. Barrier considers the finished film, with gags added, to also have been "desperately unfunny". The gags were neither as well conceived, nor as well executed as those found in the animated short films of the competing Walt Disney Productions.

Uniqueness of the cartoon
This cartoon was the only appearance of Cookie's baby brother, as well as the only time Buddy owned a dog called Happy. In subsequent cartoons, Buddy (or Cookie) owned a dog called Bozo, and in others Buddy's friend is a larger dog called Towser (cf. Buddy and Towser). This was also the only cartoon in which Buddy is so designed.

Home media
Buddy's Day Out is available on the Looney Tunes Golden Collection: Volume 6. It is one of only three Buddy cartoons released on DVD, the others being Buddy's Beer Garden and Buddy's Circus.

On PBS
A collection of cels from this short was the focus of one episode of the History Detectives series on PBS in 2010.

References

Sources

External links
 Buddies Day Out (Restored) on Dailymotion
 

1933 films
1933 animated films
1930s American animated films
1930s animated short films
American black-and-white films
Films scored by Bernard B. Brown
Films scored by Norman Spencer (composer)
Films directed by Tom Palmer (animator)
Buddy (Looney Tunes) films
Looney Tunes shorts
Rail transport films